Valentin Yuryevich Nikulin (7 July 1932, Moscow — 6 August 2005, Moscow) was a Soviet, Russian and Israeli theater and film actor.

Nikulin was born in the family of the playwright Yuri Nikulin (1907-1958) and pianist Eugeniya Brooke (1909-1982); nephew of the writer Lev Nikulin and actors Konstantin Shayne and Tamara Shayne, and a grandson of impresario Veniamin Nikulin.

Nikulin graduated from Moscow State University with a degree in law in 1957 and from the School-Studio at the Moscow Art Theatre (1956–60). From 1960-90, and from 1999 until his death, he was an actor at the Sovremennik Theatre. He also worked in films throughout his career, playing more than hundred roles.

Filmography
 Nine Days in One Year (1962) as  young physicist 
 The Road to Berth (Путь к причалу, 1962)  as Marat Lepin
 The Big Ore (Большая руда, 1964)  as Vladimir 
 Adventures of a Dentist (Похождения зубногo врача, 1965) as patient 
 Three Fat Men (Три толстяка, 1966)  as Dr. Haspar Arnery 
 The Mysterious Wall (Таинственная стена, 1967) as Canadian traveler 
 The Brothers Karamazov (Братья Карамазовы, 1969) as Smerdyakov 
 Day by Day (День за днём, 1971) as Dima
 Failure of Engineer Garin (Крах инженера Гарина, 1973) as Portier 
 The Little Mermaid (Русалочка, 1976)  as Sulpitius / Hans Christian Andersen 
 The Nose (Нос, 1977) as janitor 
 Kind Men (Добряки, 1979)  as Orest Ivanovich Muzhesky
 Visit to Minotaur (Визит к Минотавру, 1987)  as Andrea Guarneri 
 Entrance to the Labyrinth (Вход в лабиринт, 1989) as Fiscal 
 Stalin's Funeral (Похороны Сталина, 1990) as neighbor 
 Coffee with Lemon (Кофе с лимоном, 1994) as pianist 
 The Master and Margarita (Мастер и Маргарита, 1994) as episode
 Yana's Friends (Друзья Яны, 1999) as neighbour

References

External links

1932 births
2005 deaths
People's Artists of the RSFSR
Soviet male actors
Russian male actors
Russian emigrants to Israel
Moscow State University alumni
Moscow Art Theatre School alumni
Male actors from Moscow